Starry is a lemon-lime soft drink distributed in the United States by PepsiCo. Distribution first began in January 2023. The brand is aimed at competing against The Coca-Cola Company's Sprite and Keurig Dr Pepper's 7 Up. Starry replaced Sierra Mist as Pepsi's lemon-lime flavored offering, in part because Sierra Mist failed to gain market share in the growing lemon-lime category. Starry contains no caffeine, and as of January 2023 is available in Regular and Zero-Sugar varieties.

History 
In July 2022 it was reported that PepsiCo purchased a domain name for a new brand of lemon-lime drink that would eventually replace Sierra Mist. The following month, in August 2022, the company filed for a trademark for the brand name Starry as well as for a logo.

The brand began being distributed in stores in January 2023 with marketing geared towards Generation Z.

Product 
Starry is sold in cans in either 7.5 ounce or 12 ounce sizes, and in plastic bottles ranging in size from 16 ounces to 2 liters. Since its inception, Starry has been composed of carbonated water, high-fructose corn syrup, citric acid, natural flavor, and various preservatives. Starry uses high-fructose corn syrup as a sweetener, unlike its predecessor, which was sweetened using real cane sugar.

Reception 
Reception to the drink on social media suggests many feel that Starry tastes similar to its predecessor Sierra Mist, while others feel it tastes akin to Sprite, the longtime leader of the lemon-lime soft drink market. Starry is regarded as being more "citrus-y" than its predecessor.

References 

Lemon-lime sodas
PepsiCo brands
PepsiCo soft drinks
Products introduced in 2023